The following is a list of notable private military contractors and companies.

Australian companies
Unity Resources Group, Hires Ex Australian special forces, and sometimes Canadians, New Zealanders, US and British.

French companies 

 GEOS

German companies 

 Asgaard – German Security Group

Gibraltar companies
STTEP, registered in Gibraltar, mainly uses former SANDF forces.

Peruvian companies
Defion Internacional

Polish companies 

 European Security Academy

Russian companies
E.N.O.T. Corp.
Patriot
Redut
Slavonic Corps 
Wagner Group

South African companies

Executive Outcomes, (ceased operations on January 1, 1999; apparently restarted operations in November 2020)

Turkish companies
SADAT International Defense Consultancy

UK companies

US companies

See also
 List of private security companies

References